Howdenshire was a wapentake and a liberty of England, lying around the town of Howden in the East Riding of Yorkshire.

In the Anglo-Saxon period, the district was under the control of Peterborough's monastery, but it was confiscated by Edward the Confessor, and then given to the Bishop of Durham by William I of England.  It came to operate as an exclave of County Durham, much like Allertonshire, but under the dean of Durham rather than the bishop.  This peculiarity was abolished in 1846, but the district is still in use for certain administrative purposes.

See also
 Allertonshire
 Hallamshire
 Hullshire
 Winchcombeshire

References

Wapentakes of the East Riding of Yorkshire